Friedberg may refer to:

Places 
 Friedberg, Bavaria, Germany
 Friedberg, Hesse, Germany
 University of Applied Sciences Giessen-Friedberg
 Aichach-Friedberg, Bavaria, Germany
 Friedberg, Bad Saulgau, a district of Bad Saulgau, Baden-Württemberg, Germany
 Friedberg, Styria, Austria
 Frymburk in Bohemia (also known as Friedberg, Bohemia)
 Místek, former city, now part of Frýdek-Místek (also known as Friedberg, Moravia)
 Žulová in Czech Silesia (also known as Friedberg, Czech Silesia)

Other uses 
 Friedberg (surname)

See also 
 Fried (surname)
 Friedeberg (disambiguation)
 Friedberger (disambiguation)